Coulter Heights are snow-covered heights that rise between Strauss Glacier and Frostman Glacier near the coast of Marie Byrd Land. The rock outcrops of Kuberry Rocks, Matikonis Peak and Lambert Nunatak protrude above the snow surface of the heights. The feature was mapped by the United States Geological Survey from surveys and from U.S. Navy air photos, 1959–65, and named by the Advisory Committee on Antarctic Names for Neil M. Coulter, a meteorologist at Byrd Station in 1963.

See also
Karaali Rocks

References
 

Mountains of Marie Byrd Land